RIGOL Technologies,  or RIGOL, is a Chinese manufacturer of electronic test equipment.  The company has over 500 employees and more than 493 patents. Currently, RIGOL has offices in Cleveland, Ohio, Beaverton, Oregon and Munich, Germany, in addition to its headquarters in Beijing.  RIGOL's line of products includes digital oscilloscopes, RF spectrum analyzers, digital multimeters, function/arbitrary waveform generators, digital programmable power supplies, and spectrophotometers.

History
RIGOL was founded in Beijing in 1998 and released its first product, a high-performance virtual digital storage oscilloscope, in May 1999.

In 2018 the company released the new RSA5000 real-time spectrum analyzer and the MSO7000, as well as MSO5000 series, based on the new ASIC based Ultravision-II platform.

Products

References

Electronics companies of China
Electronic test equipment manufacturers
Instrument-making corporations
Manufacturing companies based in Beijing
Electronics companies established in 1998
Chinese companies established in 1998
Chinese brands